Huangfu Song (died  April 195), courtesy name Yizhen, was a military general who lived during the Eastern Han dynasty of China. He is best known for helping to suppress the Yellow Turban Rebellion and Liang Province Rebellion. He was one of three imperial commanders when the Yellow Turban Rebellion broke out, along with Zhu Jun and Lu Zhi. He was known to be a modest and generous person. Lu Zhi was removed from command after the eunuch Zuo Feng (左豐) made false accusations against him; Lu Zhi had refused to bribe Zuo Feng. Huangfu Song, who took over command of the imperial troops from Lu Zhi, continued to use Lu as a strategist and reported his contributions to the imperial court. Thus, in the same year, Lu Zhi regained his post as Master of Writing (尚书).

Life
Huangfu Song was a nephew of Huangfu Gui (皇甫规), a military general; his father Huangfu Jie (Huangfu Gui's elder brother) was the Administrator of Yanmen Commandery. He was eventually nominated as a xiaolian and maocai. Chen Fan and Dou Wu, both important imperial officials, tried to nominate Huangfu Song as an official, but Huangfu rejected their nominations.

During the Yellow Turban rebellion, Huangfu was initially sent to defeat the Yellow Turban rebels in Yingchuan, along with Zhu Jun. After their success at Yingchuan, Huangfu and Zhu were sent to quell the rebels in Runan and Chen Commanderies, and were also successful. Later, Zhang Bao was defeated and killed by imperial forces led by Huangfu Song and Guo Dian (郭典) at Xiaquyang County (下曲陽縣; west of present-day Jinzhou, Hebei), while Zhang Liang also met his end at the hands of imperial forces led by Huangfu Song at Guangzong County (廣宗縣; southeast of present-day Guangzong County, Hebei).

After the quelling of the Yellow Turban rebellion, Emperor Ling changed the era name to Zhongping. Huangfu Song recommended that one year's worth of taxes from Ji province be used as assistance for refugees who had been displaced by the rebellion; Emperor Ling agreed. The people chanted, "China is in chaos; cities become rubble. Mothers cannot protect their children, while wives lose their husbands. It is because of Huangfu that we are able to live in peace."

In 188, Huangfu Song was sent to lift the siege of Chencang, together with Dong Zhuo; Chencang had been besieged by Wang Guo (王国). In the process, Dong had several tactical and strategic disagreements with Huangfu; after Huangfu managed to achieve victory despite Dong's disagreements (resulting in Wang Guo's death), Dong became resentful and fearful of Huangfu.

In 189, Dong Zhuo was made Governor of Bing Province, and was asked to hand troops under his command to Huangfu Song; Dong refused to comply. At the time, Huangfu Song's nephew Huangfu Li (皇甫郦) advised him, "The dynasty has lost its ability to govern and China is hanging by a thread. Only Your Excellency (Huangfu Song) and Dong Zhuo can bring stability to the realm. Now, there is bad blood between the two of you, with no possibility of co-existence. Dong Zhuo is resisting orders by refusing to hand over his troops. He is harbouring wickedness by delaying his advance and claiming that there is chaos in the capital. As he is brutal and heartless, his troops are not loyal to him. Your Excellency, as grand marshal, should attack Dong Zhuo. In this way, you can show your loyalty and righteousness, as well as remove a great threat to the state. This was what Duke Huan of Qi and Duke Wen of Jin did in the past." Huangfu Song replied, "Although it is a crime to disobey orders, it is also wrong to kill someone arbitrarily. Let us report this to the imperial court and let the court decide." After Huangfu's report reached Emperor Xian, the young emperor showed it to Dong Zhuo, increasing his resentment of Huangfu.

In 190, Dong Zhuo, now in control of the imperial court, intended to kill Huangfu Song, using the pretext of giving him a new appointment to summon him to Luoyang. As Huangfu was about to depart, Liang Yan (梁衍) advised him, "Now, the Han dynasty is weak and eunuchs had caused chaos in court. Although Dong Zhuo has killed them, he is not loyal to the state. He has pillaged the capital, and deposed and crowned emperors at will. Today, he has summoned Your Excellency. In the worst case scenario, Your Excellency will be in great peril. At the very least, Your Excellency will be trapped and humiliated. Now, Dong Zhuo is at Luoyang, while the emperor is in the west. Your Excellency should use 30,000 elite troops to welcome the emperor, while declaring your intent to attack Dong Zhuo. You should then spread this intent throughout the country, and recruit troops and officers. With the Yuans closing in from his east and Your Excellency closing in from his west, Dong Zhuo can be captured." Huangfu ignored Liang Yan's advice and continued his journey to Luoyang. 

Huangfu Song's son Huangfu Jianshou was on good terms with Dong Zhuo. After knowing of Dong Zhuo's plans for his father, Jianshou hurried from Chang'an to Luoyang to meet Dong; Dong set a banquet to welcome him. Jianshou gave an emotional speech at the banquet, moving those present; even Dong Zhuo stood up, took Jianshou's hand and had Jianshou sit by his side.

Huangfu Song was made Grand Commandant September 192, but was relieved of the position February 193; he was replaced by Zhou Zhong (周忠), an uncle of Zhou Yu. He passed away due to illness as Li Jue and Guo Si began their civil war.

In Romance of the Three Kingdoms
In the 14th-century historical novel Romance of the Three Kingdoms, Huangfu Song was involved in Wang Yun's plot in getting rid of Dong Zhuo, and led the imperial forces to capture Dong Zhuo's family members and remnants in the capital.

Children and descendants
Huangfu Song was recorded to have at least 2 sons: Huangfu Jianshou and Huangfu Shuxian. Huangfu Shuxian is the paternal grandfather of Huangfu Mi. He also had a daughter who later became She Yuan's wife.

See also
 Lists of people of the Three Kingdoms

Notes

References

 
 Fan, Ye (5th century). Book of the Later Han (Houhanshu).
 Luo, Guanzhong (14th century). Romance of the Three Kingdoms (Sanguo Yanyi).

2nd-century births
195 deaths
Han dynasty generals